Mountain View Diners Company was established by Les Daniel and Henry Strys near Mountain View, New Jersey 
in Singac, New Jersey in 1938 to manufacture prefabricated diners. "A Mountain View Diner will last a lifetime" was the company motto as befitted their quality craftsmanship. Their pre-World War II diner models usually incorporated late Art Deco styling, few were produced during the war years. Post-war, streamline styling then in vogue was used. The company ceased operation in 1957 after producing over 400 diners. Subsequent to 1957, Les Daniel II established Mountain View Auto body. It is currently owned and operated by Les Daniel III.

Partial list of Mountain View diners
Sorted by Serial # where known:
 (# 234) TJ’s Pit Stop Charles Town, West Virginia
 (# 236) Mineola Diner Mineola, New York
 (# 237) Bob's Diner Queens, New York  
 (# 256) New York Ham & Eggery Diner Long Island City, New York
 (# 267) Colonial Diner Lyndhurst, New Jersey  
 (# 281) Red Robin Diner Johnson City, New York
 (# 288) El Miski White Plains, New York 
 (# 289) Chick's Diner Scranton, Pennsylvania
 (# 295) Paris Diner  Brooklyn, New York
 (# 296) Neptune Diner Lancaster, Pennsylvania 
 (# 301) Lee's Diner York, Pennsylvania 
 (# 307) Gibby's Diner Delanson, New York 
 (# 309) Pandolfi's Mattapoisett Diner Mattapoisett, Massachusetts  
 (# 310) Crazy Dog Diner Westhampton Beach, New York
 (# 313) Trolley Car Diner Philadelphia, Pennsylvania
 (# 314) Burch's Family Restaurant Gary, Indiana 
 (# 317 ) Betty-Ann's Diner Plaistow, New Hampshire 
 (# 326) Hollywood Diner Baltimore, Maryland 
 (# 328) Jack's Hollywood Diner Hollywood, Florida 
 (# 330) Crazy Otto's Empire Diner Herkimer, New York
 (# 343) Blue Point Diner Blue Point, New York 
 (# 356) Daddypop's Diner Hatboro, Pennsylvania 
 (# 359) Bel-Aire Diner Peabody, Massachusetts 
 (# 361) D-K Diner West Chester, Pennsylvania 
 (# 368) Pioneer Diner Wichita Falls, Texas 
 (# 369) Oasis Diner Burlington, Vermont 
 (# 399) West Taghkanic Diner Ancram, New York 
(# 414) Jolly Donut Sandusky, Ohio
 (# 425) 54 Diner Buena, New Jersey 
 (# 428) Patriot Diner Bourne, Massachusetts 
 (# 440) Maybrook Diner, Maybrook, New York 
 (# 441) Jackson Hole East Elmhurst, New York 
 (# 445) Tandoor Indian Restaurant New Haven, Connecticut 
 (# 446) Lake Effect Diner Buffalo, New York
 (# 457) Betsy's Diner Falmouth, Massachusetts
 (# 508) Scarfalloto's Town House Diner (Honesdale, Pennsylvania)
 (# 489) Sandy's Diner Front Royal, Virginia 
 (# 498) Relish Diner Brooklyn, New York 
 (# 514) Lou's Farm Mart Bensalem, Pennsylvania 
 (# 516) Davie's Chuck Wagon Diner Lakewood, Colorado 
 (# 522) Sally's Diner Erie, Pennsylvania 
 (# 532) Route 66 Diner Springfield, Massachusetts
(# 534) Main Line Diner (Formerly Maybrook Diner), Maybrook, New York
 29 Diner Fairfax, Virginia
 Annabelle's Diner Mentor, Ohio
 Ben's Diner Lawrenceville, New Jersey
 Bilal's Oasis Trenton, New Jersey
 Bluebird Diner Brooklyn, New York
 Blue Comet Hazleton, Pennsylvania
 Blue Sky Queens, New York
 Bobbie's Diner Savannah, Georgia
 Bob's Diner Columbia, Pennsylvania
 Centennial Diner Atlantic City, New Jersey
 Chuck Wagon Princetown, New York
 Cookstown Diner Cookstown, New Jersey
 Culinary Institute of America campus Hyde Park, New York
 Diner Indianapolis, Indiana
 Family Diner Norwalk, Connecticut
 Farmington Diner Wilton, Maine
 (# 420) Flo's Roadside Diner Clarks Hill, Indiana
 Giordano's Diner Hamilton, New Jersey
 (# 302) Glider Diner Scranton, Pennsylvania
 Joe's Diner Cincinnati, Ohio
 Kasteli Diner Mount Vernon, New York
 Lark Diner Larksville, Pennsylvania
 Mickey's Windham Diner Willimantic, Connecticut
 Magnolia Diner Joppa, Maryland
 Moosic Diner Moosic, Pennsylvania
 Morgan's Eastland Diner Irwin, Pennsylvania
 O'Rourke's Diner Middletown, Connecticut
 Panini Deli & Grill Queens, New York
 Pearl Diner Dayton, Ohio
 Pelican Diner St. Petersburg, Florida
 Pig 'N Whistle Brighton, Massachusetts
 Silver Diner Waterbury, Connecticut
 Subway Indianapolis, Indiana
 Terminal Diner, Cleveland Heights, Ohio
 Trail Diner New Milford, Pennsylvania
 Oasis Diner Plainfield, Indiana
 Village Diner Milford, Pennsylvania
 West Market Diner New York City

See also

 List of diners

References

History of 29 Diner
agilitynut.com Diners

External links

Relish Diner Williamsburg Brooklyn, New York
History of 29 Diner
Vintage Mountain View diners
 West Taghkanic Diner Ancram, New York
Davie's Chuck Wagon Diner

Diner manufacturers
Construction and civil engineering companies of the United States
Defunct companies based in New Jersey